Jarno Lippojoki is a Finnish ice hockey defenceman who currently plays professionally in Finland for Ketterä of the Mestis. He is captain of Ketterä.

References

External links

1986 births
Living people
Finnish ice hockey defencemen
Imatran Ketterä players
JYP Jyväskylä players
KooKoo players
LHC Les Lions players
Mikkelin Jukurit players
People from Imatra
SaiPa players
SaPKo players
Sportspeople from South Karelia